Robert J. Cameron was a Scottish amateur football wing half who played in the Scottish League for Queen's Park.

Personal life 
Cameron served in the Queen's Own Cameron Highlanders during the First World War and rose to the rank of lance corporal.

Career statistics

References

Year of birth missing
Scottish footballers
Scottish Football League players
British Army personnel of World War I
Place of birth missing
Association football wing halves
Queen's Park F.C. players
Date of death missing
Queen's Own Cameron Highlanders soldiers
Association football fullbacks